James Eugene "Buster" Poole (September 9, 1915 – November 16, 1994) was an American football end who played for seven seasons for the New York Giants and the Chicago Cardinals in the National Football League (NFL).  In 1964, he was inducted into the Mississippi Sports Hall of Fame.

References

External links
 

1915 births
1994 deaths
American football ends
Chicago Cardinals players
Georgia Pre-Flight Skycrackers football players
New York Giants players
Ole Miss Rebels football coaches
Ole Miss Rebels football players
People from Gloster, Mississippi
Players of American football from Mississippi
Deaths from cancer in Mississippi